The House at 303 Eaton Avenue, in Socorro, New Mexico, was built in 1893 and was listed on the National Register of Historic Places in 1991.

Its architecture is Late Victorian and vernacular Territorial Style.

It is a one-story adobe house, with a Territorial Style portico across its front.  The portal includes chamfered posts with decorative Victorian scrolled brackets.

References

National Register of Historic Places in Socorro County, New Mexico
Victorian architecture in New Mexico
Houses completed in 1893